Wolfgang Wilhelm von Pfalz-Neuburg (4 November 1578 in Neuburg an der Donau – 14 September 1653 in Düsseldorf) was a German Prince.  He was Count Palatine of Neuburg and Duke of Jülich and Berg.

Life
Wolfgang Wilhelm's parents were Philip Louis, Count Palatine of Neuburg, and Anna of Jülich-Cleves-Berg, a daughter of Wilhelm, Duke of Jülich-Cleves-Berg. He was the winner of the War of the Jülich Succession (1609–1614), and became thus the first ruler of Palatinate-Neuburg, who was also Duke of Jülich and Duke of Berg. In 1615, he was made a Knight in the Order of the Golden Fleece. Because he converted to Catholicism and practised a strict policy of neutrality in the Thirty Years' War, his territories escaped widespread destruction.

Wolfgang Wilhelm moved his residence to Düsseldorf in 1636.

Marriage and issue
Wolfgang Wilhelm married three times:
 In 1613 to Magdalene of Bavaria, who gave birth to
 Philip William, his successor.
Both children died young.
In 1651 to Countess , daughter of Egon VIII of Fürstenberg-Heiligenberg, they had no children.

Ancestry

External links

Biography and Portrait of Count palatine Wolfgang Wilhelm von Neuburg

1578 births
1653 deaths
Converts to Roman Catholicism from Lutheranism
German Roman Catholics
House of Wittelsbach
Counts Palatine of Neuburg
Dukes of Berg
Knights of the Golden Fleece
Hereditary Princes of Neuburg
People from Neuburg an der Donau